The Yudo π1 or Yudo Pi1 is a subcompact crossover SUV produced by the Chinese NEV manufacturer Yudo Auto. The side profile heavily resembles a second generation Haval H1 due to the platform being shared by Haval.

Overview

The Yudo π1 was launched on the Chinese car market in 2019. Initial price ranges from 131,800 to 166,800 yuan. 

The Yudo π1 was powered by a single front positioned motor with the motor options including a 55kW-170Nm motor and a 90kW-270Nm motor. Battery options include a 38.5lkWh lithium-ion battery capable of a 301km range for 2018, a 51kWh lithium-ion battery capable of a 426km range for 2019, and a 49.8kWh lithium-ion battery capable of a 430km range for 2020.

References 

Mini sport utility vehicles
Subcompact cars
Crossover sport utility vehicles
Cars of China
Cars introduced in 2019
Production electric cars